Royal English Programme School (or REPS)  is a private bilingual school in Thailand with more than 950 students from Nursery 1 (1 year olds) to Grade 12 (M6). It is located in Rayong Province on the Eastern Seaboard of Thailand. Specifically, Ban Chang.

REPS was the first ever English programme school in Rayong Province and the number one bilingual school.

Information
REPS is under the supervision of the Office of Private Education Commission (OPEC) and the Ministry of Education (MOE). The school admits boys and girls from 1 year (Nursery 1) through to Grade 12 (Mattayom 6). In accordance with English Programme regulations, the numbers of students per classroom is limited to 18 in Nursery 1, 20 in Nursery 2, 25 in Kindergarten, Primary and Secondary.

Location
REPS is located at 188/46 Moo 4, Pala-Banchang Road, Tambol Pala, Amphur Banchang, Rayong Province. Close to Utapao airport. It is next door to Garden International School, 1 of 2 REPS partner schools (Garden International School Rayong and Garden International School Bangkok ).

Scholarships
REPS offers Academic and Sporting Scholarships.

References

Rayong province
Schools in Thailand